Pterolophia bivittata is a species of beetle in the family Cerambycidae. It was described by Per Olof Christopher Aurivillius in 1926. It is known from Australia.

References

bivittata
Beetles described in 1926